Royal Roderick "Scottie" Campbell (August 31, 1886 – December 31, 1951) was an American football and basketball coach. He served as the head football coach at the University of Detroit—now the University of Detroit Mercy—from 1911 to 1912, at Knox College in Galesburg, Illinois from 1913 to 1914, and at Alma College from 1921 to 1935, compiling a career college football record of 75–60–12. Campbell was also the head basketball coach at Detroit (1909–1913, 1916–1919), Knox (1913–1915), and Alma (1921–1935), tallying a career college basketball mark of 218–120.

Campbell played college football at Alma in 1908 and 1909. His Scottish descent inspired school's fight name, "Scots", which was adopted during his tenure as coach. Campbell spent his later years in Detroit. He suffered a stroke on December 24, 1951, and was taken to Highland Park General Hospital in Highland Park, Michigan, where he died on December 31 of that year.

Head coaching record

College football

References

1886 births
1951 deaths
Alma Scots athletic directors
Alma Scots football coaches
Alma Scots football players
Alma Scots men's basketball coaches
Detroit Titans football coaches
Detroit Mercy Titans men's basketball coaches
Knox Prairie Fire football coaches
Knox Prairie Fire men's basketball coaches
High school football coaches in Michigan
People from St. Ignace, Michigan
Coaches of American football from Michigan
Players of American football from Michigan
Basketball coaches from Michigan
American people of Scottish descent